Toxicodendron orientale (Asian poison ivy) is an allergenic East Asian flowering plant in the genus Toxicodendron. The species was first characterized and named by Edward Lee Greene in 1905. T. orientale is known to grow in Sakhalin, Japan, Taiwan, South central China, and South Korea. It was introduced to parts of Uzbekistan.

Description 
Toxicodendron orientale is a climbing vine that grows on trees or other supports. The deciduous leaves of T. orientale are trifoliate and grow to be 3-10 cm in length. Young branches are covered with small brown hairs that turn into red lenticels as the branches mature. 

T. orientale flowers from May to June. The small yellow-green flowers grow in groups from the leaf axils. The flowers mature into yellow-brown fruit in August to September.

Caution 
All parts of Toxicodendron orientale contain urushiol, which is known to cause severe contact dermatitis.

References 

Allergology
Dioecious plants
Medicinal plants
orientale
Vines
Taxa named by Edward Lee Greene